Oberonomyia is a genus of parasitic flies in the family Tachinidae. There is one described species in Oberonomyia, O. palpalis.

Distribution
Costa Rica, Mexico.

References

Monotypic Brachycera genera
Dexiinae
Diptera of North America
Tachinidae genera